Shim Yi-young (born Kim Jin-ah on January 31, 1980) is a South Korean actress.

Career
Shim Yi-young made her acting debut in Kim Ki-duk's Real Fiction in 2000, and has since appeared in films such as Bongja, Paju, and Love, In Between, as well as television dramas such as The Sweet Thief and My Husband Got a Family.

She and Nam Ji-hyun host She and Her Car on MBC Life, an infotainment program that looks at cars from a woman's point of view, and gives suggestions about car trends and driving courses - topics previously thought to be exclusive to men. Shim also appears opposite former newscaster Jun Hyun-moo in We Are Mom and Dad from Today, a reality show airing on MBC Every 1 in which the two assume the roles of husband and wife and take care of babies; it aims to teach viewers about parenting while entertaining them with the onscreen romance.

Personal life
Shim married actor Choi Won-young on February 28, 2014 at the Grand Ballroom of the COEX Walkerhill Hotel in Samseong-dong. Shim and Choi met while filming the 2013 TV series A Hundred Year Legacy, where they played a married couple. On June 23, 2014, Shim gave birth to their first child, a girl. The couple's second daughter was born June 14, 2017 in Ilsan.

Filmography

Film
The Hunt (2016)
Precious Love (2013) 
Rockin' on Heaven's Door (2013)
Spring, Snow (2012)
Secrets, Objects (2011) 
Her Story Taking (short film from omnibus If You Were Me 5, 2011) 
How to Cross the Galaxy (short film, 2010)
Love, In Between (2010)
Paju (2009) 
Ice Bar (2006)
Cruel Winter Blues (2006) 
Cracked Eggs and Noodles (2005)
Marrying High School Girl (2004)
No Comment (2002)
Bongja (2000)
Real Fiction (2000)

Television series
O'PENing – XX+XY (2022); as Han Su-young 
Monthly Magazine Home (JTBC / 2021) (cameo,) 
Youth of May (KBS2 / 2021)
 My Wonderful Life  (MBC / 2020–2021)
Extracurricular (Netflix / 2020)
Want a Taste? (SBS / 2019)
Love Alarm (Netflix / 2019)
At Eighteen (JTBC / 2019) 
Fates & Furies (SBS / 2018)
Your House Helper (SBS/2018)
Still 17 (SBS / 2018)
Happy Sisters (SBS / 2017)
The Legend of the Blue Sea (SBS / 2016) (cameo, ep 2, 3, 4, 12)
Night Light (MBC / 2016)
Beautiful Mind (KBS2 / 2016)
Five Enough (KBS2 / 2016)
Solomon's Perjury (TV series) (JTBC / 2016)
My Mother is a Daughter-in-law (SBS / 2015)
Birth of a Beauty (SBS / 2014)
Empress Ki (MBC / 2013) (cameo)
The Suspicious Housekeeper (SBS / 2013)
Goddess of Marriage (SBS / 2013) 
A Hundred Year Legacy (MBC / 2013)
Vampire Prosecutor 2 (OCN / 2012) (guest appearance, ep 7)
Drama Special "Culprit Among Friends" (KBS2 / 2012)
Drama Special "Still Picture" (KBS2 / 2012)
My Husband Got a Family (KBS2 / 2012)
Drama Special "Duet" (KBS2 / 2011)
Marry Me, Mary! (KBS2 / 2010)
The Sweet Thief (OBS / 2009)
MBC Best Theater "눈물보다 아름다운 유산" (MBC / 2004)
Drama City "S대 법학과 미달사건" (KBS2 / 2003)
Open Drama: Man & Woman "사랑전선 북상중" (SBS / 2003)
Drama City "Forbidden Love" (KBS2 / 2002)
That's Perfect (SBS / 2001)
Law Firm (SBS / 2001)

Variety show
We Are Mom and Dad from Today (MBC Every 1 / 2013)
She and Her Car (MBC Life / 2012–present)

Theater
Minja's Golden Age (2008)

Awards and nominations

References

External links
Shim Yi-young at Cyworld
Shim Yi-young at SH Entertainment

IHQ (company) artists
Living people
People from Seoul
Actresses from Seoul
1980 births
South Korean film actresses
South Korean television actresses
L&Holdings artists